Florence Moon was an Irish suffragist, born in Birmingham.

Early life 
Florence Moon was from Birmingham, where her mother was involved in suffrage work.

Activism 
Florence Moon attended a speech by Christabel Pankhurst in 1911, and became active as a suffrage organizer in Galway. She was a founder and leader of the Connacht Women's Franchise League (C.W.F.L.). In 1914 she was part of a C.W.F.L. deputation which met Stephen Gwynn, M.P., in order to obtain his support for women teachers. She was also an active member of the Women's National Health Association. With the outbreak of the First World War, Moon and many other Galway suffragists became involved in efforts concerning the war, such as fund-raising and provisions.

Personal life 
Florence Moon was married to Charles Moon, owner of a prestigious Galway drapery store. They had three children, Blanche, Elsa, and Charles. The couple left Galway in 1918, and lived in England thereafter.

See also 

Emily Anderson
Mary Donovan O'Sullivan
Mary Fleetwood Berry
Sarah Persse

References

People from County Galway
Year of birth missing
Year of death missing
Place of birth missing
20th-century Irish people
20th-century Irish women
Irish suffragists